Trinity Washington University is a private Catholic university in Washington, D.C. Trinity is a comprehensive university with five schools; the undergraduate College of Arts & Sciences maintains its original mission as a liberal arts women's college, while men attend Trinity's other schools at both the graduate and undergraduate level. The university was founded as Trinity College by the Sisters of Notre Dame de Namur in 1897 as the nation's first Catholic liberal arts college for women. Trinity was chartered by an Act of Congress on August 20, 1897. An elite collegian institution in its early life, the college faced declining enrollment by the 1980s. It chose to begin recruiting local underprivileged students, and became predominantly black and Hispanic. Trinity became Trinity Washington University in 2004.

Today, Trinity Washington University enrolls more than 1,800 students in its undergraduate and graduate programs in the College of Arts and Sciences, School of Nursing and Health Professions, School of Education, School of Business and Graduate Studies and School of Professional Studies. Trinity enrolls more District of Columbia residents than any other private university in the city and in the nation – more than half of Trinity’s students are residents of the D.C.

Trinity’s student body in 2020 includes about 95% ethnic minorities, including about 65% Black/African American and 30% Latina/Hispanic. Trinity is designated by the U.S. Department of Education as a Minority Serving Institution and is the only university in the D.C. region, and one of only a few in the nation, designated as both a Predominantly Black Institution (PBI) and Hispanic Serving Institution (HSI).

History
Trinity College was founded by the Sisters of Notre Dame de Namur in 1897 as the nation's first Catholic liberal arts college for women. 

For more than 70 years, Trinity educated middle-class Catholic women, who were underrepresented in America's colleges. (For more background on women's higher education, see Origins and types of Women's colleges in the United States.)

When many all-male colleges became co-ed, Trinity's full-time enrollment dropped – from 1,000 in 1969 to 300 in 1989. The school's 12th president, Sister Donna Jurick, responded in the early 1980s by opening a weekend college for working women from the District of Columbia, a racially diverse population the school had previously not served. The first such program in Washington, it became very popular; within three years, it had more students than the undergraduate program.

Under Patricia McGuire, a Trinity alumna, who became president of the college in 1989, Trinity became a multifaceted university that reached out to the Black and Hispanic women of Washington. McGuire split the college into three schools: the historic women's college became the College of Arts and Sciences; the higher-revenue teacher college became the School of Education; and the continuing education classes were folded into a School of Professional Studies. Trinity began recruiting at D.C. high schools. She expanded the professional schools, whose combined enrollment rose from 639 in 1989 to 974 in 1999. By the school's 1997 centennial, it had become the private college of choice for the women of D.C. public schools.

Academics

Five schools
Trinity has an annual enrollment of more than 1,800 students in the university's five schools, which offer undergraduate and graduate degrees.

 The College of Arts and Sciences—Trinity's historic women's school—offers community service opportunities, athletics, student clubs and campus activities. The College of Arts and Sciences offers a number of undergraduate academic programs, including international affairs, criminal justice, forensic psychology, journalism, and business economics.
 Trinity's School of Education is a coeducational graduate program offering degrees in education, counseling, curriculum design, and educational administration. Through its Continuing Education Program, the School of Education also offers professional development courses enrolling 4,000 education professionals each year.
 The School of Professional Studies offers undergraduate degrees designed for women and men seeking to advance or change their careers. 
 The School of Business and Graduate Studies encompasses the graduate degree programs of Master of Business Administration (M.B.A.), Master of Science Administration (M.S.A.), and Strategic Communication and Public Relations (M.A.).
 The School of Nursing and Health Professions is home to Trinity's nursing program, which is accredited by Commission on Collegiate Nursing Education. It also offers a Master of Occupational Therapy, Master of Science in Nursing, and Master of Public Health.

Special academic programs

Trinity offers professional programs at a satellite classroom located at THEARC, a multipurpose community facility in southeast Washington, DC. Trinity is the only private university to offer college degree programs in the District of Columbia's underserved neighborhoods east of the Anacostia River.

Rankings
 U S News & World Report ranks Trinity #129-#170 in Regional Universities North.

Student body

Trinity enrolls more than 1,800 students. In 2020, the student body includes 95% persons of color, including about 65% Black/African American and 30% Latina/Hispanic. 94% of Trinity students are women, reflecting the university’s historic and ongoing commitment to women’s education.  About 80% of full-time undergraduates are eligible for Pell Grants, with a median family income of just about $25,000. Slightly more than 100 Trinity students are undocumented immigrants.

Trinity is designated by the U.S. Department of Education as a Minority Serving Institution and is the only university in the D.C. region, and one of only a few in the nation, designated as both a Predominantly Black Institution and Hispanic Serving Institution.

Trinity's 2020–21 tuition for a full-time undergraduate is $24,860 for a full year. All full-time undergraduate students in the College of Arts and Sciences receive a scholarship between $10,000 and $15,000. About 80% of the undergraduate students receive Pell Grants and most D.C. students receive D.C. TAG (D.C. Tuition Assistance Grant). With additional grants and loans, the average student pays $1,000 to $2,000 out-of-pocket for tuition.

Athletics
The Trinity Washington athletic teams are called the Tigers. The university is a member in the Division III level of the National Collegiate Athletic Association (NCAA), primarily competing as an NCAA D-III Independent since the 2015–16 academic year (which they were a member on a previous stint from 2007–08 to 2011–12). The Tigers previously competed in these defunct conferences: the Great South Athletic Conference (GSAC) from 2012–13 to 2014–15; and the Atlantic Women's Colleges Conference (AWCC) as a founding member from 1995–96 to 2006–07.

Trinity Washington competes in five intercollegiate varsity sports: basketball, soccer, softball, tennis and volleyball.

Facilities
The Trinity Center for Women and Girls in Sports was completed in 2003. It features a basketball arena; walking track; swimming pool and spa; fitness center with weight machines, free weights and cardio equipment and dance studio, tennis courts, and an athletic field. It is free for Trinity students and offers memberships to local residents.

Campus buildings

The campus includes the following buildings:

 Main Hall, which houses most of the administrative offices on campus, many faculty offices and classrooms, as well as the university's admissions office, O'Connor Auditorium, and bookstore. 
 Payden Academic Center, opened in 2016, is a LEED-certified learning center that features state-of-the-art nursing and science labs, classrooms for all disciplines and Trinity's technology hub.
 Trinity Center for Women and Girls in Sports is an athletic, recreational and educational complex located in the heart of Trinity's campus.
 Sister Helen Sheehan Library holds more than 200,000 volumes.
 Alumnae Hall, the university's dining hall, serves three meals a day throughout the academic year and is also a residence hall.
 Cuvilly Hall is a residence hall primarily for first-year students.
 Kerby Hall is a residence hall. In the 1980s, it was a residence hall for graduate students of other colleges in Washington, D.C., including Robert Casey, who studied law at Catholic University of America and later became a U.S. Senator from Pennsylvania.
 Notre Dame Chapel hosts many of Trinity's traditions, including Academic Convocation, Freshman Medal Ceremony, Cap and Gown Mass, and Baccalaureate Mass. Dedicated in 1924, it was designed by the architectural firm Maginnis and Walsh and won a national architecture award for ecclesiastical architecture from the American Institute of Architects. It was restored in 1997 and features Guastavino tiles, stained glass windows by Charles Jay Connick and a mosaic by Bancel LaFarge. The chapel hosted the pope during his 1979 visit to the United States.

Honor societies
 Phi Beta Kappa, chapter established in 1971
 Sigma Iota Rho
 Alpha Sigma Lambda
 Beta Kappa Chi
 Lambda Pi Eta
 Psi Chi
 Pi Sigma Alpha
 Phi Alpha Theta

Notable alumnae

 Joy Ford Austin, former executive director of Humanities DC
 Cathie Black, former chairman of Hearst Magazines
 Rosemary M. Collyer, Senior United States district judge of the United States District Court for the District of Columbia; currently Presiding Judge of the United States Foreign Intelligence Surveillance Court
 Kellyanne Conway, former Counselor to former President Donald Trump, and campaign strategist during his 2016 presidential campaign
 Claire Eagan, Chief Judge on United States District Court for the Northern District of Oklahoma
 Cynthia Eagle Russett, American intellectual historian at Yale University
 Regina Flannery Herzfeld, American anthropologist
 Sister Joan Frances Gormley, consecrated virgin who was a noted biblical scholar and translator
 Barbara B. Kennelly, former member of the U.S. House Representatives from Connecticut
 Maria Leavey, political strategist
 Jane Dammen McAuliffe, former President of Bryn Mawr College
Patricia McGuire, President, Trinity Washington University
 Caryle Murphy, Pulitzer Prize winning reporter, The Washington Post
 Nancy Pelosi, former Speaker of the United States House of Representatives
 Noris Salazar Allen, Panamanian bryologist
 Kathleen Sebelius, former United States Secretary of Health and Human Services; former Governor of Kansas
 M. Patricia Smith, Commissioner of Labor for the State of New York
 Maggie Williams, former campaign manager to Hillary Clinton
 Alanna Fields, Multimedia artist and archivist

References

External links
 Official website
 Official athletics website

 
Edgewood (Washington, D.C.)
Educational institutions established in 1897
Association of Catholic Colleges and Universities
Sisters of Notre Dame de Namur colleges and universities
Catholic universities and colleges in Washington, D.C.
Women's universities and colleges in the United States
1897 establishments in Washington, D.C.
Private universities and colleges in Washington, D.C.
NCAA Division III independents